The 1962 National Football League draft was held on December 4, 1961 at the Sheraton Hotel in Chicago, Illinois.

The Washington Redskins used the first overall pick of the draft to select running back Ernie Davis, then subsequently traded him to the Cleveland Browns.

Player selections

Round one

 HOF: Member of the Pro Football Hall of Fame

Round two

Round three

Round four

Round five

Round six

Round seven

Round eight

Round nine

Round ten

Round eleven

Round twelve

Round thirteen

Round fourteen

Round fifteen

Round sixteen

Round seventeen

Round eighteen

Round nineteen

Round twenty

Hall of Famers
 Lance Alworth, wide receiver from Arkansas taken 1st round 8th overall by the San Francisco 49ers, but signed with the AFL San Diego Chargers.
Inducted: Professional Football Hall of Fame class of 1978.
 Merlin Olsen, defensive tackle from Utah State taken 1st round 3rd overall by the Los Angeles Rams.
Inducted: Professional Football Hall of Fame class of 1982.
 Mick Tingelhoff, center from Nebraska undrafted and signed by the Minnesota Vikings.
Inducted: Professional Football Hall of Fame class of 2015.

Notable undrafted players

See also
 1962 American Football League Draft

References

External links
 NFL.com – 1962 Draft
 databaseFootball.com – 1962 Draft
 Pro Football Hall of Fame

National Football League Draft
NFL Draft
Draft
NFL Draft
NFL Draft
1960s in Chicago
American football in Chicago
Events in Chicago